Ulick na gCeann Burke, 12th Clanricarde or Mac William Uachtar, 1st Earl of Clanricarde (died 1544; styled MacWilliam, and na-gCeann, meaning "of the Heads", "having made a mount of the heads of men slain in battle which he covered up with earth") was an Irish noble and son of Richard Mór Burke, 9th Clanricarde (d.1530) by a daughter of Madden of Portumna.

Biography
Ulick succeeded his father to the headship of his clan, and held estates in County Galway. The same year he was present at Dublin, when an act was passed making Henry VIII King of Ireland.

In 1543, in company with other Irish chiefs, he visited the King at Greenwich and made full submission in accordance with the King's policy of "surrender and regrant". He was confirmed in the captainship and rule of Clanricarde, and on 1 July 1543, he was created Earl of Clanricarde and Baron of Dunkellin in the peerage of Ireland. He was regranted the greater part of his former estates, with the addition of other lands. The grant of the English titles was conditional upon the abandonment of native titles, the adoption of English customs and laws, the pledging of allegiance to the English crown, apostasy from the Roman Catholic Church, and conversion to the Anglican Church. In his review of the state of Ireland in 1553, Lord Chancellor Cusake stated "[t]he making of McWilliam earl of Clanricarde made all the country during his time quiet and obedient."

He did not live long to enjoy his new English dignities, but died shortly after returning to Ireland in about March 1544. He is called by the annalist of Loch Cé "a haughty and proud lord," who reduced many under his yoke, and by the Four Masters "the most illustrious of the English in Connaught".

Marriages and family
Burke married three times. Firstly, he was married to Grany or Grace, daughter of Mulrone O'Carroll. This marriage was the only one declared valid and he eventually divorced her. They had a son:
 Richard, who eventually succeeded him as Second Earl of Clanricarde. 

Secondly, he married Honora de Burgh, sister of Ulick de Burgh. He later divorced her as well.

Thirdly, he married Maire Lynch. They had a son:
 John Bourke, who claimed the earldom in 1568.

According to Burke's Peerage, he had several other sons, Thomas "the Athlete" Bourke (shot in 1545), Redmond "of the Broom" Bourke (died 1595), and Edmund Bourke (died 1597).

Legacy
As a result of his marriages and relationships, there were a number of candidates contending for the titles of Clanricarde and Earl. The eventual successor was Ulick's eldest legitimate son, Richard Sassanach Burke, 2nd Earl of Clanricarde.

Genealogy

 Richard an Fhorbhair de Burgh (d.1343)
 Sir William (Ulick) de Burgh (d. 1343/53), 1st Mac William Uachtar (Upper Mac William) or Clanricarde (Galway)
 Richard Óg Burke (d. 1387), 2nd Clanricarde
 Ulick an Fhiona Burke (d. 1424), 3rd Clanricarde
 Ulick Ruadh Burke (d. 1485), 5th Clanricarde
 Edmund Burke (d. 1466)
 Ricard of Roscam (d. 1517)
 John mac Richard Mór Burke (d. 1536), 10th Clanricarde
 Ulick Fionn Burke (d.1509), 6th Clanricarde
 Ulick Óge Burke (d. 1520), 8th Clanricarde
 Richard Mór Burke (d. 1530), 9th Clanricarde
 Ulick na gCeann Burke (d. 1544), 12th Clanricarde, 1st Earl of Clanricarde (1543)
 Richard Bacach Burke (d. 1538), 11th Clanricarde
 Richard Óge Burke (d. 1519), 7th Clanricarde
 Sir Uilleag Burke (d. 1551), 13th Clanricarde
 William mac Ulick Burke (d. 1430), 4th Clanricarde
 Edmund de Burgh (d. 1410)

Arms

References

1544 deaths
15th-century births
Burke, 1st Earl of Clanricarde, Ulick na gCeann
16th-century Irish people
Ulick na gCeann
Members of the Irish House of Lords
Earls of Clanricarde
Peers of Ireland created by Henry VIII